Kadal  is the soundtrack album, composed by A. R. Rahman for the 2013 Tamil film of the same name, directed by Mani Ratnam that stars Gautham Karthik and Thulasi Nair in the lead roles. Noted poet-lyricist Vairamuthu and his son Madhan Karky penned lyrics for three songs each. Sri Lankan rapper Aaryan Dinesh Kanagaratnam made his debut for Indian cinema with one of the songs. The album was released under Sony Music on 28 November 2012.

Development
Director Mani Ratnam's usual associate music composer, A. R. Rahman was signed to compose the songs as well as the background score for the film. Rahman visited Mani Ratnam at one of the filming locations near coastal areas of Thiruchendur where they had a boat ride into the sea to discuss about the songs. In an interview, Rahman stated that the music of Kadal is a blend of Christian gospel, blues and Carnatic music as the film plot portrays Christian fishermen. Rahman claimed the sea to be a huge inspiration and hence the song "Chithirai Nila" was born out of this inspiration. As Mani Ratnam insisted on romantic numbers, Rahman composed "Nenjukulley" and "Moongil Thottam" in the same tempo. The songs were alternate choices for Ratnam but he retained both. On composition of song "Adiye", according to the composer, most Christian gospel songs have a blues feel to them. However, he clubbed the folk genre with jazz vocal backing into it as picturisation was to be done on a village boy. Initially, Ratnam wanted the composer to croon the track but the latter had already finalised "Elay Keechan" and hence "Adiye" was sung by Sid Sriram. The operatic Italian version of song "Anbin Vaasale", sung by Natalie Di Luccio was used in the background score of the film. A gibberish song sung by A.R. Rahman, used only in the film was featured on the character Celina (played by Lakshmi Manchu).

The soundtrack features seven songs and two of the songs penned by Vairamuthu are taken from "A Compilation of Vairamuthu's Poems" and third one from his work about sea odyssey, Thanner Thesam. The song "Magudi Magudi" features vocals and lyrics by Sri Lankan rapper Aaryan Dinesh Kanagaratnam.

Release
Sony Music procured the audio rights of the soundtrack. On 2 November 2012, an unplugged version of the song "Nenjukulle" was performed by Shakthisree Gopalan in the first episode of MTV Unplugged India: Season 2, aired over MTV India channel. In an interview, Rahman stated that the performed unplugged song would differ slightly from the soundtrack version. The song garnered overwhelming response with positive feedback from several viewers over the internet. The official soundtrack version of the song was released as a single on 21 November 2012. The track "Elay Keechan" was released as a promotional single on 25 November 2012. The complete album was initially supposed to be released on 12 November 2012, although lyricist Karky as well as several media reports confirmed the same, the officials of Madras Talkies denied such release schedules. The soundtrack album was scheduled to release on 30 November 2012, but due to tremendous pre-booking orders, the audio label advanced the release by two days.

Reception

Critical response

The soundtrack album opened up with highly positive reviews. Music Aloud stated, "A R Rahman does it again for Mani Ratnam with an exquisite mix of genres not often heard in Tamil."  Indiaglitz on a positive note stated, "Rahman delivers of Mani Ratnam once again." Behindwoods quoted, "Kadal is salt of the earth stuff from A.R. Rahman that is rewarding of your time spent on it." Sri Krishna of Musicperk summarized, "There’s an unwritten rule in Indian Cinema that goes something like this: “Rahman reserves his God Mode for Mani Ratnam“. The validity of that statement has once again been established beyond ambiguity, Kadal is one for the ages, if you are a fan of deep, enduring music." Pavithra Srinivasan of Rediff stated in her review, "It's been said that A R Rahman always delivers his very best for Mani Ratnam. It looks like it with Kadal, where the composer experiments and runs riot with different styles with some success." In an interview with CNN-IBN, senior film journalist Sreedhar Pillai said, "I definitely think it [Kadal] is ARR's best in recent times, the magic is very much there!" and he added that the album "has taken Tamil music to the next level." In contrast, India Today stated that the album "falls short to be called Rahman's best", but called it "enjoyable".

Chart performance
Within a day of its release on 22 November 2012, the song "Elay Keechaan" notched to position one and "Nenjukkule" at two on iTunes India charts. Though the latter track clinched down, "Elay Keechaan" continued to be the chart topper for over two weeks. The complete album held the first position on iTunes India charts post its release. All the songs marked their position in the top ten songs category on iTunes. This made Kadal's soundtrack enter into number one soundtrack album of India by December 2012.

Track listing

Original Version
Prior to the release of the Tamil soundtrack album the song names were available over the internet by early November 2012.
The complete track listing was released on the film's official social networking page as well as on A.R. Rahman's official website on 26 November 2012.

Telugu Version

The song "Gunjukunna" was released on Madras Talkies's official YouTube channel on 6 December 2012. Lyrics for the Telugu version of the soundtrack are penned by poet Vanamali. Though the music was released on the label Sony Music, direct to stores on 19 December 2012, the audio was launched in a grand function held at H.I.C.C Novotel, Hyderabad on 2 January 2013. Suhasini Mani Ratnam and actor Arjun hosted the event. Before addressing the audience, the event opened up with composer A.R. Rahman performing medley on the keyboard, playing tunes of "Chinni Chinni Aasaa" and "Vinara Vinara" from the film Roja, thereby paying ode to his most collaborated director Mani Ratnam. Later, singer Sid Sriram performed the track "Yadike" and singers Harini and Abhay Jodhpurkar crooned "Patchani Thotta" on the stage. The lead debutantes of the film, Thulasi Nair and Gautham Karthik made their first public appearance through this event.

Accolades

See also
 Kadal
 List of films directed by Mani Ratnam featuring A. R. Rahman

References

External links
 Kadal (soundtrack) at the Internet Movie Database

A. R. Rahman soundtracks
Tamil film soundtracks
2012 soundtrack albums